Madhukar (Sanskrit, literally: "Beloved, sweet like honey"; born 4 November 1957, in Stuttgart) is a German author, teaches Advaita. He established the Yoga of Silence and Madhukar - Enlighten Life.

Life 
Madhukar grew up in Stuttgart, West Germany. He studied economic science and philosophy and worked as a TV journalist after his graduation. In the early eighties Madhukar travelled for several years through Asia and studied with the Tantric-Buddhist Dzogchen-Master Namkhai Norbu. He experienced what he calls a "spontaneous Kundalini-enlightenment."  In 1992, while staying in India, he met with spiritual teacher H.W.L. Poonja, a disciple of the Indian sage Ramana Maharshi.

Present activities 
Since 1997 Madhukar passes on his knowledge in worldwide events and retreats, traditionally called Satsang (sat = truth, sangha = community). His retreats are focused on self-enquiry (Atma vichara) with the question: “Who am I?” and dialogues on nonduality.

Madhukar emphasizes that there are close connection between spirituality and the findings of modern science. He says that quantum physics says that a transcendent energy underlies everything existing and that this finding is in harmony with spirituality. This type of philosophy is often called Quantum Woo, Quantum mysticism or pseudoscience. Madhukar says everybody can experience it, because this energy is the essence of the entire universe and of all beings. In this consciousness everything is unity, everything is one.

Philosophical core issue 

According to Madhukar the human being is living in the erroneous belief in a real “I”: “The human being believes to have freedom of action and to live in an objective world. This perception is limited. In reality each living being is pure consciousness, in which the world subjectively illustrates. With the question “Who am I?” the perceived, limited reality can be questioned and pure consciousness (the Self) can be experienced. Doubtless identification with the Self is absolute freedom, over-all love and silent happiness".

Publications 
 The Simplest Way, Editions India, 2nd edition, USA & India 2006, 
 Yoga der Liebe, Ganapati Verlag, 1.Auflage 2009, 
 Einssein, Lüchow publishers, 1st edition, Stuttgart, Germany 2007, 
 Erwachen in Freiheit, Lüchow publishers, 2nd edition, Stuttgart, Germany 2004, 
 Самый простой способ, издательство Ганга, Москва 2008, 1-е издание, .
 La via più semplice, Om Edizioni, Bologna, 
Единство, Издательство: Ганга, 2009 г, 
 Dialoger med Madhukar, GML Print on Demand AB, 2009, 
 Najenostavnejša pot do razsvetljenja, Maribor 2013, 
 Enhet: Klarhet och Livsglädje genom Advaita, GML Förlag, 2020, 
 Freedom here and now, Music-CD.
 Garden of Love, Music-CD by Madhukar & Sofya

References

Sources 

 Bittrich, D./Salvesen, C.: Die Erleuchteten kommen. Goldmann Arkana, 2002, 
 Salvesen, Christian : Advaita: Vom Glück, mit sich und der Welt eins zu sein. O.W. Barth, 2003, 
 Interview with Madhukar: Ich habe keine Lehre, in: Esotera 07/2004
 Interview with Madhukar: Diener der Wahrheit, in: One Spirit, 2003
 Christian Rieder: Die neuen Erleuchteten, in: Ursache&Wirkung, 2006
 Interview with Madhukar: Tue nichts und sei glücklich, in: Yoga Aktuell 39 - 04/2006
 Dafna Moscati, Marco Mazzotti: Il Fiore del Nirvana. Macrolibrarsi, Documentary, Italy 2008
 Es ist immer Jetzt, in: Vital 12/2009
 Schöttl, R.: Schweige-Retreat in Südindien, https://web.archive.org/web/20120126054940/http://www.essentialmagazin.at/e-book/01-2011/ p. 38/39
 Dietrich, Michael: Stille mit Madhukar, in: Yoga Aktuell 71 - 06/2011 http://www.yoga-aktuell.de/themen-bewusstsein/item/1022-stille-mit-madhukar.html?qh=YToxOntpOjA7czo4OiJtYWRodWthciI7fQ%3D%3D

External links 

Official Homepage

1957 births
Living people
Writers from Stuttgart
Advaitin philosophers
German male writers